is a Japanese musician, best known as a founding member, singer/guitarist, and primary songwriter for the pop-punk band Shonen Knife. She is the only member of the band to have remained throughout its entire history. After briefly working as a receptionist in a doctor's office, she formed the band in late 1981 with her college friend Michie Nakatani and her younger sister Atsuko Yamano. Naoko Yamano is known for her songs about food and animals, with music that is primary influenced by the Ramones and the Beatles.

References

External links
Shonen Knife Biography
From Naoko Blog

1960 births
Living people
Women guitarists
Japanese women rock singers
Japanese alternative rock musicians
Shonen Knife members
Japanese rock guitarists
Japanese punk rock musicians
People from Osaka Prefecture
20th-century Japanese women singers
20th-century Japanese singers
21st-century Japanese women singers
21st-century Japanese singers
Women punk rock singers
Pigface members